The National Basketball League Best Sixth Man is an annual National Basketball League (NBL) award given since the 1996 NBL season to the best performing reserve player of the regular season. At the season's end, each club nominates one player for the award with the head coach, one assistant coach and the team captain then voting in a 3-2-1 format (3 votes being indicative of the most deserving). Voters are not allowed to vote for players from their own team.

Winners

References

Best Sixth Man
Awards established in 1996